Walthamstow Central  is a London Underground and London Overground interchange station in the town of Walthamstow in 
the London Borough of Waltham Forest, north-east London. The two lines have separate platforms at different levels.

The station is in Travelcard Zone 3. It linked to  station on the Gospel Oak to Barking line by a broad footpath, Ray Dudley Way. Walthamstow Central is the closest tube station to Walthamstow Market, the longest outdoor market in Europe.

History

The line to London, that the Chingford branch uses today was opened two years later in 1872 from Hall Farm Junction to Bethnal Green, with the branch also being extended north to Chingford in 1873.

The GER amalgamated with several other railways to create the London and North Eastern Railway at the beginning of 1923.

In 1948 the railways were nationalised and responsibility for operating the station fell to British Railways (Eastern Region).

The line was electrified in the late 1950s with electric services commencing on 12 November 1960. Early services were formed of Class 305 EMUs but initial technical problems with these saw replacements by Class 302 and Class 304 EMUs.

The station became an interchange station and the eastern terminus of the Victoria line with London Underground services starting on 1 September 1968; when station's present name was adopted. When originally approved in 1955, the terminus of the line was to be at Wood Street, a plan dropped in 1961 before construction of the line. The platforms for the Victoria line (like all stations on the Victoria line) are underground.

On 31 May 2015, the station's Abellio Greater Anglia services were transferred to London Overground Rail Operations.

Description

General description
The underground station, like many stations on the Victoria line, was built to a low budget. White ceiling panels were never fixed to the ceilings above the platforms; instead the steel tunnel segments were painted black and used to support the fixtures and fittings, cutting lighting levels. A concrete stairway sits between two escalators instead of a third; this economy caused a disruptive station closure for several weeks in 2004 when both escalators went out of service.

The main entrance to the above-ground station is on the down side, opposite the bus station, which was revamped in summer 2004. Until August 2015 three staffed ticket windows opened, replaced by improved ticket machines. The entrance to the tube was revamped in early 2006. A smaller entrance is on the up line, facing a car park.  Its ticket office is staffed mainly in peak hours.

Major improvements
A subway was built in 2005 under Selborne Road linking a new bus station with a new Victoria line ticket office. The new subway and ticket office was scheduled for spring 2005 but problems with insufficient power capacity to supply two new lifts, planning and contractual errors, delayed the opening until 19 November 2007. The lifts began operation in late 2008 and some building work took longer to finish.

Ticket barriers control access to all platforms.

A footpath link, called Ray Dudley Way, providing a shortcut to nearby , opened in August 2014.

Plans for a new entrance with step-free access to the Victoria line platforms were approved by Waltham Forest council in January 2021 to be part-funded by a redevelopment of the shopping mall.

Services
Trains are operated by London Overground.

The typical off-peak weekday service pattern is:
4 trains per hour (tph) to London Liverpool Street;
4 tph to Chingford.

Connections
London Buses routes 20, 34, 55, 58, 69, 97, 212, 215, 230, 257, 275, 357, W11, W12, W15, W19, school route 675 and night routes N26, N38 and N73 serve the station and bus station.

Gallery

Victoria line (London Underground)

Lea Valley lines (London Overground)

References
Citations

Sources

External links 

Victoria line stations
London Underground Night Tube stations
Tube stations in the London Borough of Waltham Forest
Railway stations in the London Borough of Waltham Forest
Former Great Eastern Railway stations
Railway stations in Great Britain opened in 1870
Walthamstow
Railway stations served by London Overground
1870 establishments in England